"Brucey" (also spelled Brucie or Brucy) is usually a nickname for someone with the first name or surname "Bruce". It may refer to:

 Brucey is a character from the film The Odd Couple II.
 Brucey is also a character from the musical Little Me
 Common nickname for Bruce Forsyth (also spelled Brucie), British entertainer
 Nickname for Bruce Dickinson
 A nickname for former Birmingham FC manager Steve Bruce
 Character Brucie from video game Grand Theft Auto IV
 Character Bruce the shark from the Pixar film Finding Nemo